The Brunswick rifle was a  large calibre muzzle-loading percussion rifle manufactured for the British Army  at the Royal Small Arms Factory at Enfield in the early 19th century. Its name is derived from the historical German state of Brunswick because the British were experimenting with Hanoverian percussion cap technology during the period Great Britain and Hanover (1714–1837) had the same head of state.

History

The Brunswick rifle was one of several designs submitted to replace the Baker rifle. Unlike the Baker rifle, the Brunswick rifle used a special round ball with raised ribs that fit into two spiraling grooves in the barrel.

During its evaluation, it was noted that the Brunswick's unique round meant that the Brunswick rifle could not fire the standard British paper cartridges in use at the time. The rifle was also noted as being very heavy, and that it fired a relatively low velocity round. Despite these detriments, the rifle performed much better than expected, and the Master-General of Ordnance ordered the rifle to be produced with a  barrel of  caliber. The new rifle was designed to accept a bayonet, though the design was changed with the mounting moved farther back since experience had shown that the Baker rifle could not be fired with its bayonet fixed.

In December 1836, trials were conducted to compare the Brunswick rifle against the Baker rifle. The Brunswick rifle proved to be equally accurate at shorter ranges, and more accurate at longer ranges. The Brunswick rifle also proved to require less cleaning than the Baker rifle. Evaluators also noted that the simplified two groove design of the Brunswick was likely to have a longer service life than the barrel of the Baker, and the Brunswick rifle was noted as being very rugged overall. In January 1837, the rifle was approved for production.

An altered pattern was submitted in August 1837, and the first bulk order of 1000 rifles was given on 25 October 1837. In January the following year, it became apparent that 600 of these would be required urgently for Col. Brown's Battalion of the Rifle Brigade and that the Enfield factory would not be able to supply them in time. Thus the whole order was put out to the trade in London at a charge of 38s per rifle. The first Brunswick rifles were made by the following gunmakers:

 Tomas Potts,                212;
 Wm. Heptinstall,             55;
 Barnett & Co.,              212;
 Reynolds & Son,              55;
 Lacy & Reynolds,            210;
 Yeoman's & Son,              55;
 E. J. Baker,                146;
 Thomas Leigh,                55;
 William Parker,              80;
 W. Mills & Son,              55;
 R. E. Pritchett,             80;
 W. T. Bond,                  55;
 Thomas Ashton,               80.

Production began in March 1838, and the first mass-produced rifles were issued to the Rifle Brigade, the Canadian Rifle Regiment, and a few specialized units in 1840.

The Brunswick rifle developed a reputation for being difficult to load, but was fairly well received and remained in production for almost 50 years. The rifle was used in England and assorted colonies and outposts throughout the world. Several refinements were made to the design during its production life, and production of the rifle was finally discontinued in 1885.

The Brunswick was also manufactured in Belgium. Limited numbers of Brunswick rifles were imported to the United States during the Civil War. Some of those ended up in the hands of units such as the 26th Louisiana Infantry, which was partly equipped with Brunswicks during the Siege of Vicksburg.

Design and features

The Brunswick had a two groove barrel designed to accept a "belted" round ball. Like all rifles of the period, the Brunswick rifle suffered from the problem of being difficult to load. Rounds for rifles were required to fit tightly into the barrel so that the round would grip the rifling as it traveled down the barrel, imparting a spin to the round and improving its stability. Even though the rib and groove design of the Brunswick allowed it to use rounds that did not fit quite as tightly, the black powder used during this period would quickly foul the barrel, making even the Brunswick's design more and more difficult to load as the rifle was used.

Since the Brunswick used a round that was specifically designed to be mated with the grooves in the rifle, it had to be oriented properly in order to be loaded. This made the rifle difficult to load at night, when the grooves could not be seen.

The lock was originally a back action design, with the mainspring located behind the hammer. This design proved to be unpopular, as it weakened the wrist of the stock. Later Brunswick rifles featured a more conventional side action lock.

The stock was made of walnut, and featured a straight wrist and a low comb butt. A patch box with a hinged brass lid was located on the right side of the butt. Originally, the Brunswick rifle used a single compartment patch box. Later rifles used a slightly larger patch box with two compartments.

The ramrod pipes, trigger guard, and butt plate were all made of polished brass.

The rifle was designed to accept a sword type bayonet which mounted by use of a bayonet bar, similar to the design of that used on the Baker rifle. The bayonet bar was relocated further back due to problems that had been experienced with the Baker rifle.

The Brunswick rifle used a block front sight and a two position folding leaf rear sight which could be set for either .

Variants

The Pattern 1836 featured the original back action lock and the single compartment patch box. The first of these were  caliber. This was changed fairly early in the rifle's life, and most were  caliber. All subsequent patterns were  caliber.

The Pattern 1840 featured a dual compartment patch box, and had several minor improvements to the Pattern 1836.

The Pattern 1841 replaced the back action lock with a side lock. However, this lock change was not put into manufacturing until 1845. This version also used a wrought iron barrel instead of twisted steel, and a simple plug that replaced the break-off breech plug used in earlier patterns.

The Pattern 1848 featured other minor improvements, and used an improved bayonet latch with the locking notch located halfway along the bayonet bar on its upper side. Only a few batches of rifles produced for the British Army were fitted with this improvement.

A heavier version in  caliber was produced for the Royal Navy.

Copies of the Brunswick rifle were made in Nepal, from approximately 1840 to 1860. These copies were apparently hand made, and as such their details varied slightly. It is estimated that approximately 10,000 to 12,000 of these were made in Nepal.

See also

 British military rifles
 Rifles in the American Civil War

Notes

External links

 The Brunswick Rifle

American Civil War rifles
Rifles of the United Kingdom
British Army equipment
Early rifles
Muzzleloaders